The Spaniard is a 1925 American silent drama film directed by Raoul Walsh, written by Juanita Savage and James T. O'Donohoe, and starring Ricardo Cortez, Jetta Goudal, Noah Beery, Sr., Mathilde Brundage, Renzo De Gardi, and Emily Fitzroy. It was released on May 4, 1925, by Paramount Pictures.

Plot
As described in a film magazine review, in England Don Pedro attempts to win the heart of Dolores. She visits a bull fight in Spain and discovers the hero is Don Pedro. Afterwards in a storm, she seeks refuge in a mountain castle, and is then held prisoner by Don Pedro. His valet Gómez tries to win her by aiding her escape. During her escape she is thrown from her horse and is injured. Don Pedro rescues her from Gómez and wins her love. It turns out that he is a grandee of Spain.

Cast

Preservation
With no prints of The Spaniard located in any film archives, it is a lost film.

References

External links

Stills at silentfilmstillarchive.com

1925 films
1920s English-language films
Silent American drama films
1925 drama films
Paramount Pictures films
Films directed by Raoul Walsh
American black-and-white films
American silent feature films
Lost American films
1925 lost films
Lost drama films
1920s American films